Pakistan Under-19 cricket team are twice (2004 and 2006) Cricket World Champions at the under-19 level. Their second win made them the first, and to date only, back-to-back champions. They are also 3 time runners-up (1988, 2010 & 2014) and have finished 3rd place 4 times (2000, 2008, 2018 & 2020).

Tournament history

U-19 World Cup Record

U-19 Asia Cup Record

2004
Pakistan won the 2004 U/19 Cricket World Cup by defeating the West Indies in the final in Dhaka, Bangladesh. This was Pakistan's first time to be crowned the Under-19 World Cup champions after beating West Indies in a tight finish where Pakistan won by 25 runs under the captaincy of Khalid Latif.

2006
Pakistan won the 2006 U/19 Cricket World Cup by defeating the India in the final in Colombo, Sri Lanka, when they successfully defended a small total of 109 runs by dismissing the Indian batting lineup for 71 runs and became the first team and to date only team to defend the U-19 World Cup under the captaincy of Sarfraz Ahmed.

Current team

Head coach: Ijaz Ahmed

Management and Coaching Staff

See also
 Pakistan women's under-19 cricket team
 Pakistan men's national cricket team
 Pakistan women's national cricket team

References

C
Cricket teams in Pakistan
Under-19 cricket teams
Pakistan in international cricket